(Sven) August Heintze (1881–1941) (sometimes spelled Heinze) was a Swedish botanist.

Life
Heintze was born on 26 September 1881 to  Fredrik and Kerstin (née Svensson) Heintze in Skurup, Skåne. He had a younger sister, Anna Maria (b. 1889). He enrolled as a student at Lund University in 1901. He graduated in 1906, and earned his doctorate in 1913. His first position was as a teacher at Uddevalla kommunalgymnasium. Heintze died on 6 May 1941 in Stockholm, and is buried in the Skurups Norra Kyrkogård ("Skurup's Northern Cemetery").

He is known for his work on the classification of cormophytes, particularly the family Ranuculaceae.

Selected publications 
Publications include:
  (Cormofyt. Fylog.) (Abstract in German.)
 Heintze, August. (1932–1935) Handbuch der Verbreitungsökologie der Pflanzen. Stockholm, Selbstverlag 
 Heintze, August. (1908) Växtgeografiska anteckningar från ett par färder genom Skibottendalen i Tromsö amt. Arkiv Bot. v 7 no 11 
 Heintze, August. (1913) Växttopografiska undersökningar i Åsele Lappmarks fjälltrakter. I–II Arkiv Bot. v 12 no 11; v 13 no 5 
 Heintze, August. (1909) Växtgeografiska undersökningar i Råne socken af Norrbottens län. Arkiv Bot. v 9 no 8

Legacy 
Published names include:
 Burmanniales Heintze, Cormofyt. Fylog.: 159 1927.
 Burmanniidae Heintze, Cormofyt. Fylog.: 10. 1927.
 Marattiophyta Heintze, Cormofyt. Fylog.: 22. 1927.
 Orchididae Heintze, Cormofyt. Fylog.: 10. 1927.
 Oxalidales Heintze, Cormofyt. Fylog.: 13, 126 1927.
 Paeoniales Heintze, Cormofyt. Fylog.: 12. 1927 
 Psilotophyta Heintze, Cormofyt. Fylog.: 22. 1927.
 Ranunculaceae subfam. Thalictroideae Heintze, Cormofyt. Fylog.: 103 1927.
 Trolliinae Heintze, Cormfyt. Fylog.: 103. 1927

References

Bibliography 

 
 
 
 
 
 
 
 
 
 

20th-century Swedish botanists
Swedish taxonomists
1881 births
1941 deaths